Carsten Kober (born 11 October 1967) is a German former professional footballer who played as a defender.

References

External links
 

1967 births
Living people
Association football defenders
German footballers
Germany under-21 international footballers
VfB Lübeck players
Hamburger SV players
Hamburger SV II players
Hertha BSC players
VfL Osnabrück players
Bundesliga players
2. Bundesliga players
20th-century German people